Warnerville may refer to:
Warnerville, Stanislaus County, California
Warnerville, former name of Trinidad, California